

January

1
 1614: John Wilkins born.
 1815: Charles Bernard Renouvier born.
 1921: Ismail al-Faruqi born.

3
 106 BC: Cicero born.
 1901: Eric Voegelin born.

4
 1642: Isaac Newton born.
 1786: Moses Mendelssohn dies.
 1936: Gianni Vattimo born.
 1941: Henri Bergson dies.
 1960: Albert Camus dies.
 1961: Erwin Schrödinger dies.

5
 1548: Francisco Suárez born.
 1846: Rudolf Christoph Eucken born.
 1857: Albert Schwegler dies.
 1932: Umberto Eco born.
 2001: G. E. M. Anscombe dies.

6
 1809: Johann Augustus Eberhard dies.
 1859: Samuel Alexander born.
 1918: Georg Cantor dies.

8
 1632: Samuel von Pufendorf born.
 1642: Galileo Galilei dies.
 1905: Carl Hempel born.
 1950: Joseph Schumpeter dies.

9
 1799: Maria Gaetana Agnesi dies.
 1878: John B. Watson born.
 1908: Simone de Beauvoir born.
 1943: R. G. Collingwood dies.
 1947: Karl Mannheim dies.
 1986: Michel de Certeau dies.
 2004: Norberto Bobbio dies.

10
 1715: Christian August Crusius born.
 1794: Jean Philibert Damiron born.
 1922: Michel Henry born.

11
 1829: Karl Wilhelm Friedrich von Schlegel dies.
 1842: William James born.
 1862: Jean Philibert Damiron dies.
 1900: James Martineau dies.
 1907: Abraham Joshua Heschel born.
 1941: Emanuel Lasker dies.

12
 1729: Edmund Burke born.
 1929: Jaakko Hintikka born.

13
 1775: Johann Georg Walch dies.
 1867: Victor Cousin dies.
 1924: Paul Feyerabend born.
 1957: Jerome Frank dies.

14
 1753: George Berkeley dies.
 1875: Albert Schweitzer born.
 1898: Lewis Carroll dies.
 1901: Alfred Tarski born.
 1926: Peter Winch born.
 1931: William Ernest Johnson dies.
 1978: Kurt Gödel dies.

15
 1809: Pierre-Joseph Proudhon born.
 1919: Rosa Luxemburg dies.

16
 1838: Franz Brentano born.
 1853: Vladimir Solovyov born.
 1943: John Perry born.

17
 1798: Auguste Comte born.
 1868: Louis Couturat born.
 1889: Nikolai Chernyshevsky dies.
 1937: Alain Badiou born.

18
 1689: Montesquieu born.
 1925: Gilles Deleuze born.

19
 1200: Dōgen born.
 1865: Pierre-Joseph Proudhon dies.
 1929: Liang Qichao dies.
 1930: Frank P. Ramsey dies.
 1985: Eric Voegelin dies.

20
 1973: Amílcar Cabral dies.

21
 1870: Alexander Herzen dies.
 1887: Wolfgang Köhler born.
 1924: Vladimir Lenin dies.

22
 1263: Ibn Taymiya born.
 1561: Francis Bacon born.
 1592: Pierre Gassendi born.
 1729: Gotthold Ephraim Lessing born.
 1814: Eduard Zeller born.
 1891: Antonio Gramsci born.

23
 1744: Giambattista Vico dies.
 1862: David Hilbert born.
 2002: Pierre Bourdieu dies.
 2002: Robert Nozick dies.

24
 1679: Christian Wolff born.
 1965: Nicholas Lossky dies.

25
 1627: Robert Boyle born.
 1743: Friedrich Heinrich Jacobi born.

26
 1884: Edward Sapir born.

27
 1775: Friedrich Wilhelm Joseph von Schelling born.
 1808: David Strauss born.
 1814: Johann Gottlieb Fichte dies.
 1832: Lewis Carroll born.
 1912: Arne Næss born.

29
 1688: Emanuel Swedenborg born.
 1737: Thomas Paine born.
 2002: R. M. Hare dies.

30
 1846: F. H. Bradley born.
 1948: Mahatma Gandhi dies.

31
 1624: Arnold Geulincx born.

February

1
 1801: Émile Littré born.

2
 1970: Bertrand Russell dies.

3
 1869: Heinrich Ritter dies.
 1909: Simone Weil born.

4
 1842: Théodore Simon Jouffroy dies.
 1906: Dietrich Bonhoeffer born.

8
 1874: David Strauss dies.
 1878: Martin Buber born.
 1960: J. L. Austin dies.

10
 1755: Montesquieu dies.
 1819: Albert Schwegler born.

11
 1650: Descartes dies.
 1900: Hans-Georg Gadamer dies.

12
 1804: Immanuel Kant dies.
 1834: Friedrich Schleiermacher dies.

14
 1404: Leon Battista Alberti born.

15
 1564: Galileo Galilei born.
 1748: Jeremy Bentham born.
 1781: Gotthold Ephraim Lessing dies.
 1861: Alfred North Whitehead born.

16
 1834: Ernst Haeckel born.

17
 1444: Rodolphus Agricola born.
 1600: Giordano Bruno dies.
 1798: Friedrich Eduard Beneke born.

18
 1535: Heinrich Cornelius Agrippa dies.
 1838: Ernst Mach born.

19
 1837: Thomas Burgess dies.
 1916: Ernst Mach dies.

20
 2003: Maurice Blanchot dies.

21
 1677: Baruch Spinoza dies.
 1921: John Rawls born.
 1994: Gerda Alexander dies.

22
 1788: Arthur Schopenhauer born.
 1816: Adam Ferguson dies.
 1903: Frank P. Ramsey born.

23
 1723: Richard Price born.
 1883: Karl Jaspers born.

26
 1715: Claude Adrien Helvétius born.
 1969: Karl Jaspers dies.

27
 1861: Rudolf Steiner born.

28
 1533: Michel de Montaigne born.
 1823: Ernest Renan born.

March

1
 1768: Hermann Samuel Reimarus dies.
 1858: Georg Simmel born.

2
 1886: Kurt Grelling born.

3
 1756: William Godwin born.
 1879: William Kingdon Clifford dies.
 1983: Arthur Koestler dies.

4
 1826: Elme Marie Caro born.

6
 1866: William Whewell dies.
 1917: Donald Davidson born.

7
 322 BC: Aristotle dies.
 1274: Thomas Aquinas dies.

9
 1836: Antoine Destutt de Tracy dies.
 1897: Jamal al-Din al-Afghani dies.

10
 1772: Karl Wilhelm Friedrich von Schlegel born.
 1819: Friedrich Heinrich Jacobi dies.

11
 1738: Cesare, Marquis of Beccaria born.
 1843: Harald Høffding born.

12
 1685: George Berkeley born.
 1925: Sun Yat-sen dies.

13
 2: Apollonius of Tyana born.
 2002: Hans-Georg Gadamer dies.

14
 1883: Karl Marx dies.
 1905: Raymond Aron born.

17
 180: Marcus Aurelius dies.

18
 1919: G. E. M. Anscombe born.
 1980: Erich Fromm dies.

19
 1908: Eduard Zeller dies.
 1928: Hans Küng born.

20
 1727: Isaac Newton dies.

21
 1812: William George Ward born.
 1949: Slavoj Žižek born.

22
 1832: Johann Wolfgang von Goethe dies.

23
 1900: Erich Fromm born.

25
 1865: Woo Tsin-hang born.
 1980: Roland Barthes dies.

26
 1882: Thomas Hill Green dies.

27
 1765: Franz Xaver von Baader born.

28
 1794: Marquis de Condorcet dies.
 1911: J. L. Austin born.

29
 1772: Emanuel Swedenborg dies.

30
 1135: Maimonides born.
 1925: Rudolf Steiner dies.
 1930: Félix Guattari born.

31
1596: Descartes born.

April

3
 1880: Otto Weininger born.
 2000: Terence McKenna dies.

4
 397: Ambrose dies.

5
 1588: Thomas Hobbes born.

6
 1773: James Mill born.
 1796: George Campbell dies.

7
 1798: Pierre Leroux born.
 1836: William Godwin dies.
 1836: Thomas Hill Green born.

8
 1835: Wilhelm von Humboldt dies.
 1859: Edmund Husserl born.

9
 1626: Francis Bacon dies.
 1754: Christian Wolff dies.
 1945: Dietrich Bonhoeffer dies.

10
 1583: Hugo Grotius born.
 1955: Pierre Teilhard de Chardin dies.

12
 1963: Kazimierz Ajdukiewicz dies.

13
 1743: Thomas Jefferson born.
 1882: Bruno Bauer dies.
 1885: György Lukács born.

14
 1986: Simone de Beauvoir dies.

15
 1877: W. D. Ross born.
 1980: Jean-Paul Sartre dies.

17
 1975: Sarvepalli Radhakrishnan dies.

18
 1817: George Henry Lewes born.
 1880: Aristotelian Society for the Systematic Study of Philosophy founded.
 1999: Gian-Carlo Rota dies.

19
 1791: Richard Price dies.
 1914: Charles Sanders Peirce dies.

20
 1932: Giuseppe Peano dies.

21
 1109: Anselm of Canterbury dies.
 1142: Pierre Abélard dies.
 1805: James Martineau born.
 1938: Muhammad Iqbal dies.
 1998: Jean-François Lyotard dies.

22
 1724: Immanuel Kant born.

25
 1472: Leon Battista Alberti dies.

26
 121: Marcus Aurelius born.
 1711: David Hume born.
 1889: Ludwig Wittgenstein born.
 1938: Edmund Husserl dies.

27
 1820: Herbert Spencer born.
 1932: Gian-Carlo Rota born.

28
 1816: Johann Heinrich Abicht dies.

29
 1951: Ludwig Wittgenstein dies.

30
 1736: Johann Albert Fabricius dies.
 1823: Paul Janet born.

May

1
 1881: Pierre Teilhard de Chardin born.

3
 1469: Niccolò Machiavelli born.
 1764: Francesco Algarotti dies.

4
 1762: Johann Heinrich Abicht born.
 1845: William Kingdon Clifford born.

5
 1813: Søren Kierkegaard born.
 1818: Karl Marx born.
 1971: W. D. Ross dies.

6
 1947: Martha Nussbaum born.

7
 399 BC: Socrates dies.
 1861: Rabindranath Tagore born.

8
 1873: John Stuart Mill dies.
 1936: Oswald Spengler dies.

9
 1751: Jacob Friedrich von Abel born.
 1805: Friedrich Schiller dies.

10
 1886: Karl Barth born.

11
 1881: Henri-Frédéric Amiel dies.

12
 1806: Johan Vilhelm Snellman born.
 1946: Gareth Evans born.

16
 1718: Maria Gaetana Agnesi born.

17
 1729: Samuel Clarke dies.

18
 1692: Joseph Butler born.
 1872: Bertrand Russell born.
 1891: Rudolf Carnap born.
 1900: Félix Ravaisson-Mollien dies.

19
 1762: Johann Gottlieb Fichte born.

20
 1806: John Stuart Mill born.

21
 427 BC: Plato born?
 1817: Hermann Lotze born.
 1935: Jane Addams dies.
 1953: Ernst Zermelo dies.

23
 1841: Franz Xaver von Baader dies.

24
 1794: William Whewell born.

25
 1805: William Paley dies.

26
 1976: Martin Heidegger dies.

27
 1986: Ismail al-Faruqi dies.

28
 1998: Virgil Aldrich dies.
 2001: Francisco Varela dies.

29
 1880: Oswald Spengler born.

30
 1778: Voltaire dies.
 1832: James Mackintosh dies.

31
 1753: Pierre Victurnien Vergniaud born.
 1838: Henry Sidgwick born.

June

1
 1952: John Dewey dies.

2
 1740: Marquis de Sade born.
 1881: Émile Littré dies.

4
 470 BC: Socrates born.
 1971: Georg Lukács dies.

5
 1723: Adam Smith born (baptized).
 1937: Hélène Cixous born.

6
 1832: Jeremy Bentham dies.
 1909: Isaiah Berlin born.

8
 632: Muhammad dies.
2007: Richard Rorty dies.
 1896: Jules Simon dies.

10
 2003: Bernard Williams dies.

11
 1818: Alexander Bain born.
 1828: Dugald Stewart dies.

13
 1884: 
 Leon Chwistek born.
 Étienne Gilson born.
 1965: Martin Buber dies.

14
 1916: Georg Henrik von Wright born.

16
 1752: Joseph Butler dies.
 2003: Georg Henrik von Wright dies.

17
 1693: Johann Georg Walch born.
 1996: Thomas Samuel Kuhn dies.

18
 1870: Édouard Le Roy born.
 1929: Jürgen Habermas born.

19
 1623: Blaise Pascal born.
 1947: John Ralston Saul born.

20
 1723: Adam Ferguson born.
 1824: Maine de Biran dies?
 1840: Pierre Claude François Daunou dies.

21
 1527: Niccolò Machiavelli dies.
 1763: Pierre Paul Royer-Collard born.
 1788: Johann Georg Hamann dies.
 1905: Jean-Paul Sartre born.
 1908: William Frankena born.

22
 1767: Wilhelm von Humboldt born.

23
 1668: Giambattista Vico born.
 1836: James Mill dies.

24
 1941: Julia Kristeva born.

25
 1908: Willard Van Orman Quine born.

26
 1688: Ralph Cudworth dies.
 1702: Philip Doddridge born.
 1984: Michel Foucault dies.

27
 1884: Gaston Bachelard born.
 1908: Charles Stevenson born.
 1989: Alfred Ayer dies.

28
 1712: Jean-Jacques Rousseau born.
 2001: Mortimer Adler dies.

29
 1315: Ramon Llull dies.

July
1743: William Paley born.

1
 1646: Gottfried Leibniz born.
 1676: Anthony Collins born.
 1871: Henry Longueville Mansel dies.
 1881: Hermann Lotze dies.
 1983: Buckminster Fuller dies.

2
 1750: Thomas Spence born.
 1778: Jean-Jacques Rousseau dies.
 1931: Harald Høffding dies.

3
 2002: Michel Henry dies.

4
 1826: Thomas Jefferson dies.
 1881: Johan Vilhelm Snellman dies.
 1937: Thomas Nagel born.

5
 1907: Kuno Fischer dies.

6
 1796: Théodore Simon Jouffroy born.
 1882: William George Ward dies.

7
 1829: Jacob Friedrich von Abel dies.

8
 1885: Ernst Bloch born.
 1993: Henry Hazlitt dies.

9
 1797: Edmund Burke dies.
 1962: Georges Bataille dies.

11
 1905: Muhammad Abduh dies.

12
 1536: Erasmus dies.
 1895: Buckminster Fuller born.

13
 1887: Elme Marie Caro dies.

14
 1879: Johann Karl Friedrich Rosenkranz dies.
 1951: Esther Dyson born.

15
 1892: Walter Benjamin born.
 1901: Nicola Abbagnano born.
 1930: Jacques Derrida born.

17
 1698: Pierre Louis Maupertuis born.
 1790: Adam Smith dies.

18
 1797: Immanuel Hermann Fichte born.
 1922: Thomas Samuel Kuhn born.

20
 1754: Antoine Destutt de Tracy born.

21
 1911: Marshall McLuhan born.

23
 1824: Kuno Fischer born.

24
 1940: Stanley Hauerwas born.

25
 1834: Samuel Taylor Coleridge dies.

26
 1988: Fazlur Rahman dies.

27
 1759: Pierre Louis Maupertuis dies.
 1871: Ernst Zermelo born.
 1999: Aleksandr Danilovich Aleksandrov dies.

28
 1804: Ludwig Andreas Feuerbach born.
 1902: Karl Popper born.

29
 1929: Jean Baudrillard born.

31
 1784: Denis Diderot dies.
 1932: John Searle born.

August

1
 1930: Pierre Bourdieu born.

3
 1780: Étienne Bonnot de Condillac dies.

4
 1912: Aleksandr Danilovich Aleksandrov born.
 1977: Ernst Bloch dies.

5
 1895: Friedrich Engels dies.

6
 1638: Nicolas Malebranche born.
 1969: Theodor Adorno dies.

7
 1906: Nelson Goodman born.
 1941: Rabindranath Tagore dies.

8
 1694: Antoine Arnauld dies.
 1694: Francis Hutcheson born.
 1746: Francis Hutcheson dies.
 1879: Immanuel Hermann Fichte dies.
 1919: Ernst Haeckel dies.
 1930: George Soros born.
 1931: Roger Penrose born.

10
 1801: Christian Hermann Weisse born.
 1843: Jakob Friedrich Fries dies.
 1924: Jean-François Lyotard born.
 1980: Gareth Evans dies.

12
 1484: George of Trebizond dies.
 1512: Alessandro Achillini dies.
 1686: John Balguy born.
 1837: Pierre Laromiguière dies.

15
 1069: Ibn Hazm dies.
 1872: Sri Aurobindo born.

18
 1761: Pierre Claude François Daunou born.

19
 1662: Blaise Pascal dies.

20
 1854: Friedrich Wilhelm Joseph von Schelling dies.
 1886: Paul Tillich born.

21
 1245: Alexander of Hales dies.

23
 1773: Jakob Friedrich Fries born.
 1921: Kenneth Arrow born.

24
 1943: Simone Weil dies.

25
 1776: David Hume dies.
 1892: Richard Lewis Nettleship dies.
 1900: Friedrich Nietzsche dies.

26
 1910: William James dies.

27
 1730: Johann Georg Hamann born.
 1770: Georg Wilhelm Friedrich Hegel born.
 1858: Giuseppe Peano born.

28
 430: Augustine of Hippo dies.
 1645: Hugo Grotius dies.
 1749: Johann Wolfgang von Goethe born.
 1757: David Hartley dies.
 1900: Henry Sidgwick dies.

29
 1632: John Locke born.

30
 1705: David Hartley born.
 2003: Donald Davidson dies.

September

1
 1648: Marin Mersenne dies.
 1903: Charles Bernard Renouvier dies.

2
 1845: Pierre Paul Royer-Collard dies.
 1949: Hans-Hermann Hoppe born.

3
 1819: Alexander Campbell Fraser born.
 1894: John Veitch dies.
 1939: Edvard Westermarck dies.

4
 1965: Albert Schweitzer dies.

5
 1888: Sarvepalli Radhakrishnan born.
 1905: Arthur Koestler born.

6
 1729: Moses Mendelssohn born.
 1809: Bruno Bauer born.
 1860: Jane Addams born.

7
 1946: Francisco Varela born.

8
 1588: Marin Mersenne born.

9
 1945: Robert Alexy born.
 1976: Mao Zedong dies.

10
 1839: Charles Sanders Peirce born.

11
 1903: Theodor Adorno born.

13
 1592: Michel de Montaigne dies.
 1872: Ludwig Andreas Feuerbach dies.
 1938: Samuel Alexander dies.

14
 1486: Heinrich Cornelius Agrippa born.
 1930: Allan Bloom born.
 1970: Rudolf Carnap dies.

15
 973: Biruni born.
 1926: Rudolf Christoph Eucken dies.

16
 1814: Émile Saisset born.
 1897: Georges Bataille born.

17
 1743: Marquis de Condorcet born.
 1994: Karl Popper dies.

18
 1903: Alexander Bain dies.

19
 1866: Christian Hermann Weisse dies.

20
 1899: Leo Strauss born.

21
 1748: John Balguy dies.
 1860: Arthur Schopenhauer dies.
 1919: Fazlur Rahman born.
 1919: Mario Bunge dies.
 1929: Bernard Williams born.

22
 1253: Dōgen dies.

25
 1805: Johann Karl Friedrich Rosenkranz born.

26
 1889: Martin Heidegger born.

27
 1821: Henri-Frédéric Amiel born.
 1907: Maurice Blanchot born.
 1940: Walter Benjamin dies.

28
 551 BC: Confucius born (traditionally).
 1918: Georg Simmel dies.

29
 1864: Miguel de Unamuno born.

30
 1715: Étienne Bonnot de Condillac born.

October

1
 1499: Marsilio Ficino dies.
 1911: Wilhelm Dilthey dies.
 1914: Stuart Hampshire born.

2
 1869: Mahatma Gandhi born.

3
 1981: Tadeusz Kotarbiński dies.

4
 1903: Otto Weininger dies.
 1931: Richard Rorty born.

5
 1703: Jonathan Edwards born.
 1713: Denis Diderot born.
 1714: Kaibara Ekken dies.
 1781: Bernard Bolzano born.

6
 1820: Henry Longueville Mansel born.
 1831: Richard Dedekind born.

7
 1796: Thomas Reid dies.
 1885: Niels Bohr born.
 1894: Herman Dooyeweerd born.
 1992: Allan Bloom dies.

8
 1879: Chen Duxiu born.
 1973: Gabriel Marcel dies.
 2004: Jacques Derrida dies.

9
 1253: Robert Grosseteste dies.
 1950: Nicolai Hartmann dies.
 2000: Charles Hartshorne dies.

10
 1560: Jacobus Arminius born.
 1780: John Abercrombie born.
 1873: Arthur O. Lovejoy born.

11
 1675: Samuel Clarke born.
 1881: Hans Kelsen born.

12
 1600: Luis de Molina dies.
 1602: William Chillingworth born.
 1892: Ernest Renan dies.
 1991: Gregory Vlastos dies.

13
 1282: Nichiren dies.
 1694: Samuel von Pufendorf dies.
 1715: Nicolas Malebranche dies.

14
 1906: Hannah Arendt born.
 2001: David Kellogg Lewis dies.

15
 55 BC: Lucretius dies.
 1844: Friedrich Nietzsche born.
 1881: William Temple born.
 1926: Michel Foucault born.

16
 1854: Oscar Wilde born.
 1918: Louis Althusser born.
 1962: Gaston Bachelard dies.

17
 1760: Claude Henri de Rouvroy, comte de Saint-Simon born.
 1889: Nikolai Chernyshevsky dies.
 1983: Raymond Aron dies.

18
 1771: Heinrich von Kleist born.
 1775: Christian August Crusius dies.
 1859: Henri Bergson born.
 1871: Charles Babbage dies.
 1909: Norberto Bobbio born.
 1955: José Ortega y Gasset dies.
 1973: Leo Strauss dies.

19
 1433: Marsilio Ficino born.
 1609: Jacobus Arminius dies.
 1926: Joel Feinberg born.

20
 1463: Alessandro Achillini born.
 1859: John Dewey born.
 1866: Kazimierz Twardowski born.
 1978: Anders Nygren dies.

21
 1772: Samuel Taylor Coleridge born.

22
 1965: Paul Tillich dies.

23
 1813: Félix Ravaisson-Mollien born.
 1990: Louis Althusser dies.

24
 1655: Pierre Gassendi dies.
 1765: James Mackintosh born.
 1829: John Veitch born.
 1958: George Edward Moore dies.

25
 1180: John of Salisbury dies.
 1400: Geoffrey Chaucer dies.
 1767: Benjamin Constant born.
 1806: Max Stirner born.

26
 1751: Philip Doddridge
 1944: William Temple dies.
 1983: Alfred Tarski dies.

27
 1466: Erasmus born.
 1485: Rodolphus Agricola dies.

28
 1704: John Locke dies.

29
 1783: Jean le Rond d'Alembert dies.
 1910: Alfred Ayer born.

30
 1862: Friedrich Meinecke born.
 1953: Woo Tsin-hang dies.
 2003: Richard Taylor dies.

31
 1793: Pierre Victurnien Vergniaud dies.
 1841: Georg Anton Friedrich Ast dies.

November

2
 1815: George Boole born.

3
 1756: Pierre Laromiguière born.

4
 1873: George Edward Moore born.
 1995: Gilles Deleuze died.

5
 1997: Isaiah Berlin dies.

7
 994: Ibn Hazm born.
 1913: Albert Camus born.

8
 1308: Duns Scotus dies.

9
 1877: Muhammad Iqbal born.
 1934: Carl Sagan born.

10
 1759: Friedrich Schiller born.

11
 1668: Johann Albert Fabricius born.
 1675: Gottfried Leibniz demonstrated integral calculus for the first time to find the area under the graph of a function y = f(x) by using antiderivatives. 
 1751 Julien Offray de La Mettrie dies.
 1855: Søren Kierkegaard dies.

12
 1866: Sun Yat-sen born.
 1915: Roland Barthes born.

13
 354: Augustine of Hippo born.

14
 1633: William Ames dies.
 1716: Gottfried Leibniz dies.
 1831: Georg Wilhelm Friedrich Hegel dies.
 1844: John Abercrombie dies.

15
 1280: Albertus Magnus dies.
 1932: Alvin Plantinga born.

16
 1717: Jean le Rond d'Alembert born.
 1938: Robert Nozick born.
 1946: Terence McKenna born.

19
 1672: John Wilkins dies.

20
 1862: Edvard Westermarck born.

21
 1694: Voltaire born.
 1768: Friedrich Schleiermacher born.
 1791: Heinrich Ritter born.

22
 1753: Dugald Stewart born.

23
1709 Julien Offray de La Mettrie born.

24
 1632: Baruch Spinoza born.

25
 1998: Nelson Goodman dies.

27
 1198: Abraham ben David dies.

28
 1792: Victor Cousin born.
 1794: Cesare, Marquis of Beccaria dies.
 1820: Friedrich Engels born.
 1878: George Henry Lewes dies.
 1894: Henry Hazlitt born.

29
 1766: Maine de Biran born.

30
 1900: Oscar Wilde dies.

December

2
 1814: Marquis de Sade dies.

4
 1679: Thomas Hobbes dies.
 1801: Karl Ludwig Michelet born.
 1975: Hannah Arendt dies.

5
 749: John of Damascus dies.
 1901: Werner Heisenberg born.
 1950: Sri Aurobindo dies.

6
 1919: Paul de Man born.
 1956: B. R. Ambedkar dies.

7
 43 BC: Cicero dies.
 1889: Gabriel Marcel born.
 1928: Noam Chomsky born.

8
 1830: Benjamin Constant dies.
 1864: George Boole dies.
 1903: Herbert Spencer dies.
 1924: Lucio Colletti born.

9
 1842: Peter Kropotkin born.
 2004: Paul Edwards dies.

10
 1198: Averroes dies.
 1882: Otto Neurath born.
 1968: Karl Barth dies.

11
 1712: Francesco Algarotti born.
 1857: Georgy Plekhanov born.
 1901: Michael Oakeshott born.

12
 1890: Kazimierz Ajdukiewicz born.
 1905: Emmanuel Lévinas born.

13
 1048: Biruni dies.
 1204: Maimonides dies.
 1784: Samuel Johnson dies.

14
 1630: Anne Finch Conway born.

15
 1673: Margaret Cavendish dies.
 1828: Nikolai Fyodorovich Fyodorov born.

16
 1863: George Santayana born.
 1893: Karl Ludwig Michelet dies.
 1929: Bernard Crick born.

17
 1846: Richard Lewis Nettleship born.
 1863: Émile Saisset dies.

18
 1803: Johann Gottfried Herder dies.
 1848: Bernard Bolzano dies.
 1933: Hans Vaihinger dies.

19
 1990: Michael Oakeshott dies.

20
 1902: Sidney Hook born.
 1996: Carl Sagan dies.

21
 1878: Jan Łukasiewicz born.
 1983: Paul de Man dies.

22
 1694: Hermann Samuel Reimarus born.
 1880: George Eliot dies.
 1945: Otto Neurath dies.

23
 1972: Abraham Joshua Heschel dies.

24
 1868: Emanuel Lasker born.

25
 8 BC-4 BC: Jesus born (traditionally).
 1642: Isaac Newton born.
 1719: George Campbell born.
 1995: Emmanuel Lévinas dies.
 2000: Willard Van Orman Quine dies.

26
 1536: Yi I born.
 1771: Claude Adrien Helvétius dies.
 1792: Charles Babbage born.
 1893: Mao Zedong born.
 1934: Richard Swinburne born.

27
 1571: Johannes Kepler born.
 1782: Henry Home, Lord Kames dies.
 1814: Jules Simon born.

28
 1706: Pierre Bayle dies.
 1902: Mortimer Adler born.
 1903: John von Neumann born.
 1906: Nikolai Fyodorovich Fyodorov dies.

30
 1691: Robert Boyle dies.
 1887: C. D. Broad born.
 1947: Alfred North Whitehead dies.

31
 1384: John Wycliffe dies.
 1936: Miguel de Unamuno dies.
 1980: Marshall McLuhan dies.

Anniversaries (list)